William C. Joyner was an American politician from Arizona. He served a single term in the Arizona State Senate during the 8th Arizona State Legislature, holding one of the two seats from Pima County. He also served as the state game warden, and was responsible for the construction of the Hunt Bass Hatchery House.

Biography
Joyner was born in 1880 in Newburg, Missouri.  After graduating high school in Missouri, he received his bachelor's degree from the Missouri School of Mines.  Joyner was a trainman by occupation, and was employed in that capacity when he moved to Tucson, Arizona from Missouri in 1920, and was a member of the Brotherhood of Railway Trainmen. He also served two terms as a trustee on the University of Arizona Board of Regents and served as the Arizona state chairman for the Democrats.  In 1929, he moved from Tucson to Phoenix and entered the real estate business.  He was a veteran of the Spanish–American War, having fought in Cuba.

In 1926 he ran for and won one of the two seats from Pima County to the Arizona State Senate. In 1928, he decided not to run for re-election to the State Senate, instead attempting to gain the Democrat nomination for Arizona Secretary of State. While he won Pima County, he did not perform well in the rest of the state, and finished a distant third, with 9100 votes, behind W. H. Linville (13,270 votes) and J. C. Callaghan (17,769 votes), the eventual winner.  He served as the state's game warden, and was responsible for the construction of the Hunt Bass Hatchery House.

In 1936 he attempted to run for the State Senate again, this time from Maricopa County, but finished a distant 5th out of 8 Democrat candidates in the primary. In 1940 he was supervisor in Maricopa and Yuma Counties for the decennial United States census.  In 1940, after the census, he moved to Waynesville, Missouri.  He died on July 17, 1943, in a hospital in Waynesville.

References

Democratic Party Arizona state senators
20th-century American politicians
People from Phelps County, Missouri
1880 births
1943 deaths